Chris Duke is a retired American soccer defender who played professionally in the Major Indoor Soccer League and Continental Indoor Soccer League.

Duke attended the University of San Diego, playing on the men’s soccer team from 1985 to 1988. On July 9, 1989, the Kansas City Comets selected Duke in the third round of the Major Indoor Soccer League draft.  The Comets folded at the end of the 1990-1991 season.  On March 4, 1992, Duke signed with the Kansas City Attack.  He played until the end of the season.  On June 20, 1995, he joined the Pittsburgh Stingers of the Continental Indoor Soccer League.

External links
 MISL stats

References

Living people
1967 births
American soccer players
Kansas City Attack players
Kansas City Comets (original MISL) players
Continental Indoor Soccer League players
Major Indoor Soccer League (1978–1992) players
National Professional Soccer League (1984–2001) players
San Diego Toreros men's soccer players
Pittsburgh Stingers players
Association football defenders